In music, Op. 82 stands for Opus number 82. Compositions that are assigned this number include:

 Brahms – Nänie
 Britten – Children's Crusade
 Elgar – Violin Sonata
 Glazunov – Violin Concerto
 Glière – Concerto for Coloratura Soprano
 Prokofiev – Piano Sonata No. 6
 Reicha – 24 Horn Trios
 Schumann – Waldszenen
 Sibelius – Symphony No. 5
 Strauss – Daphne